Reinsurance sidecars, conventionally referred to as "sidecars", are financial structures that are created to allow investors to take on the risk and return of a group of insurance policies (a "book of business") written by an insurer or reinsurer (henceforth re/insurer) and earn the risk and return that arises from that business.  A re/insurer will only pay ("cede") the premiums associated with a book of business to such an entity if the investors place sufficient funds in the vehicle to ensure that it can meet claims if they arise.  Typically, the liability of investors is limited to these funds.  These structures have become quite prominent in the aftermath of Hurricane Katrina as a vehicle for re/insurers to add risk-bearing capacity, and for investors to participate in the potential profits resulting from sharp price increases in re/insurance over the four quarters following Katrina.  An earlier and smaller generation of sidecars were created after 9/11 for the same purpose.

Precedents
Sidecars have precedents in the reinsurance market under the name "quota-share reinsurance."  In such an agreement, a re/insurer agrees to cede to the quota-share reinsurer a percentage of all premiums arising from a book of business in exchange for the reinsurer bearing the same percentage liability for losses.  The quota-share reinsurer pays an amount called the "ceding commission" to compensate the ceding company for its expenses.  The ceding commission typically also includes a profit allowance, which increases in proportion to the expected profitability of the business.  These reinsurance treaties currently and traditionally provide ceding companies with the ability to write more business than they could bear based on their own capital and to earn a certain amount of fee-based income (through the ceding commission). Quota-share reinsurers act as insurance wholesalers, allowing them to earn a return on capital without creating primary insurance distribution.  Lloyd's of London "names" act as such reinsurers, placing the resources of individual and firms at risk to books of business written by professional underwriters and agents.

Early sidecars: reinsurance joint ventures
Re/insurers have occasionally created joint ventures through which multiple parties place capital at the disposal of one or more expert underwriters for the same reasons.  The earliest sidecars were created in Bermuda in the 1990s in such a fashion, and included Top Layer Re and OpCat, both of which placed capacity under the control of Renaissance Re on the part of other re/insurers (Overseas Partners, State Farm).

Market growth following 9-11 and Hurricane Katrina
In the years following 9-11, the idea of raising funds from capital markets investors in addition to re/insurers to support quota-shares arose and a handful of such ventures were consummated (Olympus, DaVinci, Rockridge).  These were the first true sidecars, and were a natural outgrowth of the development of re/insurance as an asset class in the form of catastrophe bonds.

Following Hurricane Katrina, the sidecar idea became very prominent among investors because it was seen as a way to participate in the risk/return of the higher-priced ("hard") reinsurance market without investing in either existing reinsurers (who might have liabilities from the past that would undermine returns) or new reinsurers ("newcos" that would have a lengthy and expensive "ramp up" period).  Three such entities were up and running by year end 2005:

These entities have been created since 2006: 

Together with supplementary capital raises at Olympus, DaVinci, Blue Ocean and Kaith, this brought the total capital raised to over $4bn by September 2006 and established sidecars as a major capital raising vehicle for catastrophe risk.

By year end 2006, it began to appear as though supply and demand in the reinsurance and catastrophe bond markets had achieved balance at the prevailing price level.  The market began to "soften" (fall in price), particularly following the decision by the State of Florida to expand the size of the reinsurance protection offered by the Florida Hurricane Catastrophe Fund by at least $12 billion in January 2007.  Creation of new sidecars slowed markedly in the first half of 2007 in consequence, with only one transaction being closed that included an equity offering (Starbound II, itself in some respects as much a rollover of Starbound I as a new transaction).  The sidecar market continued to be active, however, with three different issuers accessing the bank loan market for debt to leverage their own equity:  Hannover Re (Kepler), the Citadel reinsurance companies (Emerson) and State Farm (Merna, primarily a 4(2) bond issuance but in part a bank loan offering).

Sidecar investments

Investors are typically offered debt (generally in the form of bank loans), preferred stock and equity investments in the sidecar.  Debt may be rated by the rating agencies, which include Standard & Poor's, Moody's and A. M. Best.  Most sidecar debt has been rated in the "BB" category (below investment grade), but some investment grade debt has been issued.  In 2007, the rating agencies offered detailed criteria discussions for this type of issuance.

Market participants

Investment banks including WTW Securities, GC Securities, Aon Securities, Goldman Sachs, Merrill Lynch, Morgan Stanley, Swiss Re Capital Markets and Deutsche Bank have advised on the creation of sidecars, typically alongside specialist consultancies such as Risk Management Solutions.

Lead equity investors that have been publicly disclosed include J.C. Flowers, First Reserves, Goldentree, Highfields Capital Management, Goldman Sachs and Farallon.

Numerous law firms have been active in this field, notably Mayer Brown LLP, Cadwalader, Wickersham & Taft, Conyers Dill & Pearman in Bermuda and Fried Frank, Willkie Farr & Gallagher, Dewey & LeBoeuf, Debevoise & Plimpton, and others in the US and UK.

See also
 Catastrophe bonds
 Reinsurance
 Alternative risk transfer
 Captive insurance

Notes

External links
 Reinsurance sidecars – list of recent collateralized reinsurance sidecar deals and launches
 What is a reinsurance sidecar? – explainer on reinsurance sidecars

Bonds (finance)
Reinsurance